Craig Peterson (born July 18, 1985) is an American football placekicker for the Arizona Rattlers of the Indoor Football League (IFL).

Professional career
On March 23, 2015, Peterson was assigned to the Tampa Bay Storm. On May 19, 2016, Peterson was placed on reassignment.

On February 21, 2017, Peterson signed with the Spokane Empire. On March 10, 2017 Peterson was released. Peterson was 4 of 5 on field goals, and 6 of 11 on point after touchdowns. Peterson re-signed with the Empire on March 15, 2017.

On April 19, 2019, Peterson was assigned to the Columbus Destroyers.

On November 30, 2022, Peterson signed with the Arizona Rattlers of the Indoor Football League (IFL).

References

External links
Arena Football bio

Living people
1985 births
American football placekickers
Cortland Red Dragons football players
Tampa Bay Storm players
Spokane Empire players
Carolina Cobras (NAL) players
People from Ballston, New York
Columbus Destroyers players